The Phoenix Chorale is a professional chamber choir based in Phoenix, Arizona, United States.

The ensemble formed in 1958 as the Bach and Madrigal Society. After years as an amateur ensemble, the group went fully professional (meaning all the singers are compensated) in 1990 and changed its name to the Phoenix Bach Choir under Swedish conductor Anders Öhrwall. From 1992 until 1998, their conductor was Jon Washburn and in 1999, Charles Bruffy took over as conductor and Artistic Director.

In 2004, they signed a recording contract with Chandos Records. Their 2007 recording of works by Alexander Gretchaninov, made in collaboration with the Kansas City Chorale, was nominated for four Grammy Awards: Best Classical Album, Best Choral Performance, Best Surround Sound Album, and Best Engineered Classical Album--and won in the Engineering category. The group's collaborative recording with the Kansas City Chorale of works by Josef Rheinberger was nominated for two Grammy Awards: Best Choral Performance and Best Surround Sound Album.

In August 2008, the name of the ensemble was changed from the Phoenix Bach Choir to the Phoenix Chorale, and shortly thereafter, the group released a SACD on Chandos Records titled Spotless Rose: Hymns to the Virgin Mary, which received nominations for two Grammy Awards: Best Classical Album and Best Small Ensemble Performance. At the Grammy pre-telecast awards ceremony on February 8, 2009, the Grammy for Best Small Ensemble Performance was awarded to the chorale and its conductor, Charles Bruffy.

Their most recent collaborative recording with the Kansas City Chorale, Rachmaninoff's All-Night Vigil, was nominated for Grammy Awards for Best Choral Performance and Best Engineered Album, Classical and won the Grammy for Best Choral Performance. 

In October of 2017, Bruffy concluded his 18-year tenure with the group and in May 2019, after a nearly two-year search,  Christopher Gabbitas, a former member of The King's Singers, was announced as the next Artistic Director of the Chorale.

Discography
Phoenix Chorale
A Southwest Christmas (Soundset Recordings, 1997)
Shakespeare in Song (Chandos Records, 2004)
A Spotless Rose (Chandos Records, 2008)
Northern Lights: Choral Works by Ola Gjeilo (Chandos Records, 2012)

Phoenix Chorale and Kansas City Chorale
Eternal Rest (Chandos Records, 2006)
Gretchaninov: Passion Week (Chandos Records, 2007)
Rheinberger: Sacred Choral Works (Chandos Records, 2007)
Rachmaninoff: All-Night Vigil (Chandos Records, 2015)

References

External links
Phoenix Chorale website
Chandos Records website
New York Times Review

Chamber choirs
American choirs
Musical groups established in 1958
1958 establishments in Arizona
Bach choirs